The Association Electronique Libre (AEL, sometimes written Association électronique libre) is a Belgian non-profit digital rights advocacy and legal organization based in Belgium. Its stated mission is to "protecting the fundamental rights in the information society". It is promoting the Free Software Pact Initiative.

It has organized protests against the concept of software patents.

References

Computer law organizations
Non-profit organisations based in Belgium
Privacy organizations
Politics and technology
Internet-related activism
Intellectual property activism
Civil liberties advocacy groups
Internet governance advocacy groups